Royal Air Force Sumburgh or more simply RAF Sumburgh is a former Royal Air Force satellite station that was located on the southern tip of the mainland island of the Shetland Islands, and was home to half of No. 404 Squadron RCAF (Royal Canadian Air Force). 
At the outbreak of the Second World War the airstrip at the Sumburgh Links was taken over by the Air Ministry. By 1941 there were three operational runways at RAF Sumburgh from which a variety of RAF aircraft operated.

History

Sumburgh Links was surveyed and the grass strips laid out by Captain E. E. Fresson in 1936, and the airport was opened on 3 June of that year with the inaugural flight from Aberdeen (Kintore) by de Havilland Dragon Rapide G-ACPN piloted by Captain Fresson himself. It was also one of the first airfields to have RDF facilities, due to the frequency of low cloud and fog and the proximity of Sumburgh Head. The building of runways was at the instigation of Capt Fresson, who had proved to the Royal Navy at Hatston (Orkney) that it was essential to maintain all-round landing facilities over the winter months. This was taken up by the air force after the obvious success of the Hatston experiment.

The longest runway is 800 yards, and the shorter running a length of 600 yards from shoreline to shoreline.  No. 404 Squadron operated Bristol Beaufighter Mark VI and X aircraft from this station on coastal raids against Axis shipping off the coast of Norway and in the North Sea.

No. 404 Squadron pioneered the use of unguided rocket projectiles against enemy merchant shipping sailing off the Norwegian coast by launching joint strike attacks with No. 144 Squadron (torpedo aircraft or 'Torbeaus') from RAF Sumburgh and RAF Wick in 1943 and early 1944.

The following units were posted to the airfield at some point:

Post war

Scheduled services continued during the war and, in 1946, British European Airways started a scheduled service with Junkers 52s and then Douglas DC-3s. The main runway was lengthened in the mid-1960s.

Current use

The airfield, now called Sumburgh Airport, is owned by the Highlands and Islands Airports Limited, and commercial flights are provided by Loganair and Highland Airways.

References

Citations

Bibliography

Sumburgh
Sumbu
Mainland, Shetland